JP Keane was an Australian amateur tennis player who won the 1909 Australasian Championships in the men's doubles with Ernie Parker, beating Tom Crooks and Anthony Wilding in the final.

Grand Slam finals

Doubles (1 title)

References 

Australian male tennis players
Grand Slam (tennis) champions in men's doubles
20th-century deaths
1880s births
Place of birth missing
Australasian Championships (tennis) champions
Year of death missing